The Lively massacre occurred in 1813, when a group of Native Americans killed John Lively, his wife, Mary Jane, and most of their children in an area now known as Washington County, Illinois. Reported survivors included an eight-year-old daughter who was staying with another family during the time of the attack and possibly a son who may have been away on a hunting trip or out herding cattle.

References

External links
1813 original document

Family murders
Massacres by Native Americans
1813 in Illinois
Native American history of Illinois